Irina Blok (born ) is a graphic designer and an artist. She is best known for the creation of the Android logo including its green robot icon.

Irina Blok has appeared on ABC's Reality Show Shark Tank as one of the contestants, and her designs were featured in NBC NY, USA today, SF weekly, the French Edition of Elle Magazine and multiple publications around the world.

Blok received her degree in Graphic Design at San Jose State University. She started her career at Landor Associates as brand designer, and helped create and evolve the brands of HP, Visa, H&R Block and FedEx. She continued her career at a number of tech companies including Yahoo, Google and Adobe. In the course of her career her design work has appeared in Communication Arts magazine, How magazine, AIGA CI Annual, and Creative Review. She is also a directed study advisor at the Graphic Design MFA Program at the Academy of Art University in San Francisco.

References

External links
Personal website

Year of birth missing (living people)
Living people
Russian graphic designers
Women graphic designers
Android (operating system)
Academy of Art University faculty
Artists from Saint Petersburg